The Inter-American Convention on the International Return of Children is a treaty of the Organization of American States and was adopted at Montevideo, Uruguay on July, 15 1989 at the Fourth Inter-American Specialized Conference On Private International Law.  Its entry into force was November 4, 1994. 
                                           
The convention begins by broadly describing its intent in Article 1:

Over half of the 35 member states of the Organisation of American States are party to the Hague Convention on the Civil Aspects of International Child Abduction, and over a third of the member states are also party to the Inter-American Convention on the International Return of Children. When a state is party to both conventions, Article 34 of the Inter-American Convention assigns priority to the Inter-American Convention over the Hague Abduction Convention unless otherwise agreed upon between the states individually.

See also
 International child abduction
 Inter-American Court of Human Rights
 Hague Abduction Convention

References

External links
Text of the treaty
Ratifications

International child abduction
Organization of American States treaties on Private International Law
Treaties concluded in 1989
Treaties entered into force in 1994
Treaties of Antigua and Barbuda
Treaties of Argentina
Treaties of Brazil
Treaties of Bolivia
Treaties of Belize
Treaties of Colombia
Treaties of Costa Rica
Treaties of Ecuador
Treaties of Mexico
Treaties of Nicaragua
Treaties of Paraguay
Treaties of Peru
Treaties of Uruguay
Treaties of Venezuela
1989 in Uruguay